After the downfall of the Whig Junto during the previous Parliament, King William III had appointed a largely Tory government, which was able to gain ground at the election, exploiting the decline in Whig popularity follow the end of hostilities with France. During the election, the rival East India Companies attempted to secure the election of MPs sympathetic with their interests by interfering in the electoral process to some extent in at least 86 constituencies. Contests were held in 92 of the constituencies, just over a third of the total. The new Parliament lasted less than a year, and its proceedings were dominated by the attempt to confer the succession of the Crown on the House of Hanover.

Summary of the constituencies
See 1796 British general election for details. The constituencies used in England and Wales were the same throughout the period. In 1707 alone the 45 Scottish members were not elected from the constituencies, but were returned by co-option of a part of the membership of the last Parliament of Scotland elected before the Union.

Party strengths are an approximation, with many MPs' allegiances being unknown.

See also 
 5th Parliament of King William III
 List of parliaments of England

References

External links
 History of Parliament: Members 1690–1715
 History of Parliament: Constituencies 1690–1715

1701 in politics
Elections to the Parliament of England
General election
18th-century elections in Europe